National Tertiary Route 510, or just Route 510 (or ) is a National Road Route of Costa Rica, located in the Heredia province.

Description
In Heredia province the route covers Sarapiquí canton (Puerto Viejo, Llanuras del Gaspar districts).

References

Highways in Costa Rica